Agnes Mary Clerke (10 February 1842 – 20 January 1907) was an Irish astronomer and writer, mainly in the field of astronomy. She was born in Skibbereen, County Cork, Ireland, and died in London.

Family 
Agnes Clerke was the daughter of John William Clerke (c. 1814–1890) who was, at the time, a bank manager in Skibbereen, and his wife Catherine Mary Deasy (born circa 1819) whose father was a judge's registrar. She had two siblings; her older sister, Ellen Mary (1840-1906) and her younger brother, Aubrey St. John (1843-1923). Her elder sister Ellen also wrote about astronomy. All of the Clerke children were entirely home schooled.  

Catherine Clerke had been educated at the Ursuline Convent, and therefore placed a great deal of importance on the education of young girls.

Life and work 
Following in her father's footsteps — while studying classics, he had also taken courses in astronomy
— she developed an interest in astronomy from an early age, using her father's 4-inch telescope in her observations and had begun to write a history of astronomy at the age of 15. 

In 1861, aged 19, her family moved to Dublin, and in 1863 to Queenstown (present-day Cobh). At the age of 25, partly for health reasons together with her elder sister Ellen, she went to Italy where she stayed until 1877, chiefly at Florence, studying science, languages, and other subjects that would be useful in their later lives. In 1877, she settled in London.

Upon her return, she was able to get two articles, "Brigandage in Sicily" and "Copernicus in Italy", written while she had been in Italy, published in the Edinburgh Review of October 1877. This led to her being asked by Adam and Charles Black, publishers of the Review, who also published the Encyclopædia Britannica, to write biographies of a number of famous scientists for the ninth edition of the encyclopedia. 

This led to a number of other commissions, including the publication of the article on astronomy for the Catholic Encyclopedia. 

During her career she wrote reviews of many books, including some written in French, German, Greek, or Italian. In 1885, she published her best known work, A Popular History of Astronomy during the Nineteenth Century. This book became commonly used for its discussion of the spectroscope.

In 1888 she spent three months at the observatory at the Cape of Good Hope.

In the autumn of 1890, Clerke and her brother Aubrey were founding members of the British Astronomical Association. 

In 1893, Clerke was awarded the Actonian Prize of 100 guineas by the Royal Institution. As a member of the British Astronomical Association she attended its meetings regularly, as well as those of the Royal Astronomical Society. In 1903, with Margaret Lindsay Huggins, she was elected an honorary member of the Royal Astronomical Society, a rank previously held only by three other women, Caroline Herschel and Mary Somerville (in 1835), and Anne Sheepshanks (in 1862).

She died of pneumonia in 1907 at her home in South Kensington.

Personal life
Agnes and Ellen were devout Catholics all their lives. Neither ever married.

Legacy
The lunar crater Clerke is named after her.

In 2002, Mary Brück wrote Agnes Mary Clerke and the Rise of Astrophysics.

In 2017, the Royal Astronomical Society established the Agnes Clerke Medal for the History of Astronomy or Geophysics, which is awarded to individuals who have achieved outstanding research into the history of astronomy or geophysics. The first recipient was Clive Ruggles.

In 2022 Jessie Kennedy and the Celestial Quartet performed a concert in Skibbereen in honour of Clerke. The performance included songs specially composed by Jessie Kennedy and by Tess Leak, using words of Agnes and her sister, Ellen, and a cello trio, the Agnes Clerke Cello Trio, composed by Diana Llewellyn.

Selected writings 
A Popular History of Astronomy during the Nineteenth Century. Edinburgh, 1885 (4th rev. ed. London, 1902)
The System of the Stars. London, 1890 (2nd ed. London, 1905)
The Herschels and Modern Astronomy. London, 1895
The Concise Knowledge Astronomy (co-authored with John Ellard Gore and Alfred Fowler). London, 1898
Problems in Astrophysics. London, 1903

She also wrote 55 articles for the Edinburgh Review, mainly on subjects connected with astrophysics, and articles for the Dictionary of National Biography, the Encyclopædia Britannica and the Catholic Encyclopedia, and several other periodicals. Her articles in the ninth edition (1875–89) of the Britannica included Galileo Galilei, Alexander von Humboldt, Johannes Kepler, Antoine Lavoisier and the zodiac.

References

Further reading

External links

 
 
 
  Bibliography of writings about Agnes Mary Clerke.
 Biographical material from the Astronomical Society of the Pacific
 
 Irish Examiner article
 Southern Star article

1842 births
1907 deaths
People from Skibbereen
Irish non-fiction writers
Irish women non-fiction writers
Irish astronomers
Women astronomers
19th-century women scientists
Irish women mathematicians
19th-century astronomers
19th-century Irish writers
Women science writers
19th-century Irish women writers
Historians of astronomy
Contributors to the Catholic Encyclopedia